Helena Randáková is a Czech ski-orienteering competitor. She won a bronze medal in the relay event at the 2009 World Ski Orienteering Championships, with Barbora Chudíková and Simona Karochová, and placed 5th in the long distance.

See also
 Czech orienteers
 List of orienteers
 List of orienteering events

References

Czech orienteers
Female orienteers
Ski-orienteers
Year of birth missing (living people)
Living people